Solomon Lazarov Goldstein or Solomon Lazarevič Gol'dštejn (25 May 1884 – 14 May 1968) was a Jewish Bulgarian politician, one of the founders of the Bulgarian Metal Workers’ Union and of the Swiss Communist Party.

Life
Goldstein was born in Shumen, a city in the eastern part of the Principality of Bulgaria, to a Jewish family. He was a member of the Bulgarian Social Democratic Workers' Party (Narrow Socialists) from 1906 to 1913. In 1913 he left Bulgaria for France, where he joined the French Section of the Workers' International. While working in the Renault factories, Goldstein became acquainted with Bolshevism. In 1915 he left France for Zurich, Switzerland, where he met and befriended Vladimir Lenin, the future leader of the October Revolution of 1917. During his stay in Switzerland, he was among the chief participants in the establishment of the Swiss Communist Party.

After spending some time in Moscow from 1918 on, from May 1919 to February 1920 he served as the representative of the Bolshevik Party in Bulgaria. In this capacity he criticized the perceived "passivity" of the Bulgarian communists under Dimitar Blagoev, and supported the efforts of some extreme-left factions to force the Bulgarian party to action through acts of terrorism such as the assassination of the former Interior Minister Mihail Takev in January 1920. While in Bulgaria, Goldstein was also active as a journalist in left-wing print media. In a brochure which he signed as "Slavi Zidarov", Goldstein was critical of the Bulgarian Communist Party's inability to turn the 1918 soldier rebellion at Radomir into a nationwide communist revolution.

He returned to now-Soviet Russia in 1920 and was active in the politics of the Comintern until 1921. In 1922–1924 he served as cadre-in-chief of the Soviet legation in the Austrian capital Vienna. According to Aurel Plasari, historian and director of the National Library of Albania, Goldstein was the mastermind behind Albania's June Revolution of 1924. In 1924 the Internal Macedonian Revolutionary Organization entered negotiations with the Comintern about collaboration between the communists  and the creation of a united Macedonian movement. Goldstein was active by the signing of a paper in Vienna (the so-called May Manifesto), in which the objectives of the unified Macedonian liberation movement were presented. He also was present in 1925 by the IMRO (United) foundation in Vienna.

After the death of Lenin in 1924, Goldstein sided with the left opposition of the Communist Party of the Soviet Union, possibly due to Adolph Joffe's influence. Consequently, he was targeted by Joseph Stalin's purges and suffered political persecution from 1936 until his rehabilitation in 1956. He died in the Soviet capital of Moscow on 14 May 1968.

References

Further reading
Oren, Nissan: Bulgarian Communism. The Road to Power, 1934 – 1944. New York, London, 1971, p. 37.
Gol'štejn, Solomon Lazarevič: Lenin menja učil bol'ševizmu, in: "O Vladimire Il'iče Lenine. Vospominanija 1900 – 1922 godu". Moskva 1963, 192 – 199, p. 626.
Serge, Victor: Mémoirs d’une révolutionnaire de 1901 à 1941, Paris 1951.
Ascher, Abraham: Pavel Axelrod and the development of Menshevism. Harvard University Press, 1972.

1884 births
1968 deaths
Bulgarian communists
Bulgarian people of Jewish descent
Bulgarian journalists
People from Shumen
Soviet politicians
Bulgarian Comintern people
Bulgarian emigrants to the Soviet Union
20th-century journalists